The Object of My Affection is a 1998 American romantic comedy-drama film directed by Nicholas Hytner and starring Jennifer Aniston and Paul Rudd. The film was adapted from the novel of the same name by Stephen McCauley and the screenplay was written by Wendy Wasserstein. The story concerns a pregnant New York social worker who develops romantic feelings for her gay new friend and decides to raise her child with him, and the complications that ensue.

It was filmed in 1997 in various locations around New York City, New Jersey, and Connecticut. The film received mixed reviews and was a moderate box office success grossing $46.9 million against a production budget of $15 million.

Plot
Social worker Nina Borowski is a bright young woman living in a cozy Brooklyn apartment. Nina attends a party given by her stepsister Constance and her husband, Sidney. There Nina meets George Hanson, a young, handsome, and gay first grade teacher. Nina tells George that her stepsister is constantly trying to fix her up with somebody from higher society, completely ignoring the fact that Nina has a boyfriend, Vince. During the conversation, Nina offers George a room in her apartment as she has just heard from his boyfriend, Dr. Robert Joley, that George is looking for somewhere to live. George, not knowing about Robert's plans, is taken aback and heartbroken, and after the party the two split up. George accepts Nina's offer and moves into her apartment.

The two soon become best friends; they watch films together and go ballroom dancing. Everything is great until Nina announces that she is pregnant. Vince, the baby's father, wants to marry her, but his constant control drives Nina crazy; she leaves him and George offers to help raise her child. For some time, they live together in her apartment in Brooklyn. Everything is perfect again until Nina finds that her love for George is growing every day, especially after he tells her he had a girlfriend in high school, leading her to believe they might develop a romantic relationship.

One afternoon, George and Nina are about to have sex when George gets a phone call from Robert who tells him how much he has missed him and invites him away for the weekend. George is confused but agrees to go. Nina feels threatened and gets jealous. George and Robert do not re-establish their relationship, but George meets Paul James, a young actor, and the two are attracted to each other and have sex. Meanwhile, Nina is staying with Constance at a vacation mansion and is extremely moody. She has a horrible time and decides to head back home and asks George to return as well. Her purse is snatched on the way and a friendly police officer, Louis, gives her a ride home.

Nina decides to invite Paul and his older acting mentor with whom he lives, Rodney, for Thanksgiving after a rather prickly brunch with a late arriving George, his brother Frank and his brother's latest fiancée. After the evening winds down, Paul stays the night with George, resulting in a heated argument between George and Nina, and heartache for Rodney.

At Frank's wedding, they continue their discussion as Nina has begun to realize the reality of the situation. Nina fully explains to George her feelings for him. George, who loves Nina as his best friend, tells her that, ultimately, he wants to be with Paul. A few hours later, Nina gives birth to a beautiful girl she names Molly. Vince, ecstatic, visits her in the hospital, but when he leaves to complete paperwork, Nina and George remain alone with Molly. Nina asks George when he plans to move out to which he replies that he doesn't know. She asks him to move out of her apartment before she gets home from the hospital, stating that it would hurt her too much to have him stay any longer knowing that he doesn't love her the same way she does him.

Eight years later at George's school, everyone goes to see Molly in a musical production that George has directed. George is now the principal of the school. Nina is now in a relationship with Louis, and George is still with Paul, both of them now happy. Rodney is also there, still considered 'one of the family' by Louis and Nina. Nina, George, and young Molly (who refers to George as her "Uncle George") walk together, hand-in-hand, on their way to get coffee and talk.

Cast

Production
The shooting took place from June to July 1997, in New York. Winona Ryder was initially offered the role of Nina, but turned it down so Uma Thurman was cast opposite Keanu Reeves but both dropped out. Jennifer Aniston and Paul Rudd were cast instead.

Release

Box office
The Object of My Affection was released in US theaters on April 17, 1998, and took in $9,725,855 during its opening weekend, coming in at No. 2 at the box office in 1,890 theaters, averaging  $5,146 per theater. The film went on to gross $29,187,243 in the United States alone, over a span of five weekends. The film continued to open in European countries throughout the fall and winter of 1998, and ultimately grossed $17,718,646 outside of the United States.

Critical reception
Critical reaction to the film was mixed. Roger Ebert gave the film two stars, saying: "The Object of My Affection deals with some real issues and has scenes that work, but you can see the wheels of the plot turning so clearly that you doubt the characters have much freedom to act on their own."
Ruthe Stein of the San Francisco Chronicle said the film "occasionally borders on being too clever. But that's a small quibble about a movie that gets so much right."

The film holds a rating of 53% on the review aggregation website Rotten Tomatoes based on 59 reviews. The site's consensus states: "Despite heartfelt performances from Jennifer Aniston and Paul Rudd, The Object of My Affection suffers from too many plot contrivances and frequent turns into rom-com sappiness."
Metacritic gave the film a weighted average score of 51% based on 18 critics.

Accolades 
In efforts of the film it received a GLAAD Media award nomination for Outstanding Film (Wide Release), and won the London Critics Circle Film award for British Supporting Actor of the Year awarded to actor Nigel Hawthorne.

Soundtrack

Additional Music

See also

Wanderlust 2012, film starring Aniston and Rudd in love interest roles

References

External links

 

1998 films
1998 comedy films
1998 drama films
1998 LGBT-related films
1998 romantic comedy-drama films
20th Century Fox films
American LGBT-related films
American pregnancy films
American romantic comedy-drama films
Films based on American novels
Films directed by Nicholas Hytner
Films produced by Laurence Mark
Films scored by George Fenton
Films set in New York City
Films shot in Connecticut
Films shot in New Jersey
Films shot in New York City
Gay-related films
LGBT-related romantic comedy-drama films
1990s pregnancy films
1990s English-language films
1990s American films